Vadum is a village and satellite community just outside Aalborg, Denmark. Vadum has a population of 2,532 (1 January 2022).

Notable people 
 Niels Busk (born 1942 in Vadum) a Danish politician and Member of the European Parliament 
 Henrik Bo Nielsen (born 1961 in Vadum) a Danish arts administrator, CEO of Roskilde Museum

References

Cities and towns in the North Jutland Region
Towns and settlements in Aalborg Municipality